Theuley is a commune in the Haute-Saône department in the region of Bourgogne-Franche-Comté in eastern France.

A hometown of Jules Rimet, Theuley dedicated a monument to him in 1998. It was inaugurated by the French Minister of Youth Affairs and Sports, Marie-George Buffet.

See also
Communes of the Haute-Saône department

References

Communes of Haute-Saône